Angul may refer to:

 Angul, a town in Odisha, India
 Angul district, district
 Angul (Odisha Vidhan Sabha constituency), legislative constituency
 Angul (king), a figure in Danish mythology